Pulse wave velocity (PWV) is the velocity at which the blood pressure pulse propagates through the circulatory system, usually an artery or a combined length of arteries.  PWV is used clinically as a measure of arterial stiffness and can be readily measured non-invasively in humans, with measurement of carotid to femoral PWV (cfPWV) being the recommended method. cfPWV is highly reproducible, and predicts future cardiovascular events and all-cause mortality independent of conventional cardiovascular risk factors. It has been recognized by the European Society of Hypertension as an indicator of target organ damage and a useful additional test in the investigation of hypertension.

Relationship with arterial stiffness 
The theory of the velocity of the transmission of  the pulse through the circulation dates back to 1808 with the work of Thomas Young. The relationship between pulse wave velocity (PWV) and arterial wall stiffness can be derived from Newton's second law of motion applied to a small fluid element, where the force on the element equals the product of density (the mass per unit volume) and the acceleration. The approach for calculating PWV is similar to the calculation of the speed of sound, in a compressible fluid (e.g. air):

,

The Frank / Bramwell-Hill equation 
For an incompressible fluid (blood) in a compressible (elastic) tube (e.g. an artery):

,

where  is volume per unit length and is pressure. This is the equation derived by Otto Frank,  and John Crighton Bramwell and Archibald Hill.

Alternative forms of this equation are:

The Moens–Korteweg equation 
The Moens–Korteweg equation  equation:

 ,

characterises PWV in terms of the incremental elastic modulus of the vessel wall, the wall thickness , and the radius. It was derived independently by Adriaan Isebree Moens and Diederik Korteweg and is equivalent to the Frank / Bramwell Hill equation:

These equations assume that:

 there is little or no change in vessel area.
 there is little or no change in wall thickness.
 there is little or no change in density (i.e. blood is assumed incompressible).
  is negligible.

Variation in the circulatory system 
Since the wall thickness, radius and incremental elastic modulus vary from blood vessel to blood vessel, PWV will also vary between vessels. Most measurements of PWV represent an average velocity over several vessels (e.g. from the carotid to the femoral artery).

Dependence on blood pressure 
PWV intrinsically varies with blood pressure. PWV increases with pressure for two reasons:

 Arterial compliance decreases with increasing pressure due to the curvilinear relationship between arterial pressure and volume.
 Volume increases with increasing pressure (the artery dilates), directly increasing PWV.

Experimental approaches used to measure pulse wave velocity 
A range of invasive or non-invasive methods can be used to measure PWV. Some general approaches are:

Using two simultaneously measured pressure waveforms 
PWV, by definition, is the distance traveled by the pulse wave divided by the time for the wave to travel that distance:

,

in practice this approach is complicated by the existence of reflected waves. It is widely assumed that reflections are minimal during late diastole and early systole. With this assumption, PWV can be measured using the `foot' of the pressure waveform as a fiducial marker from invasive or non-invasive measurements; the transit time corresponds to the delay in arrival of the foot between two locations a known distance apart.  Locating the foot of the pressure waveform can be problematic. The advantage of the foot-to-foot PWV measurement is the simplicity of measurement, requiring only two pressure wave forms recorded with invasive catheters, or non-invasively using pulse detection devices applied to the skin at two measurement sites, and a tape measure.

Using pressure and volume, or pressure and diameter 
This is based on the method described by Bramwell & Hill who proposed modifications to the Moens-Kortweg equation. Quoting directly, these modifications were:

Hence "

where  represents the wall thickness (defined as above),  the elastic modulus, and  the vessel radius (defined as above).

Using pressure-flow velocity, pressure-volumetric flow relationships or characteristic impedance 
The Water hammer equation expressed either in terms of pressure and flow velocity, pressure and volumetric flow, or characteristic impedance can be used to calculate local PWV:

,

where  is velocity, is volumetric flow,  is characteristic impedance and is the cross-sectional area of the vessel. This approach is only valid when wave reflections are absent or minimal, this is assumed to be the case in early systole.

Using diameter-flow velocity relationships 
A related method to the pressure-flow velocity method uses vessel diameter and flow velocity to determine local PWV. It is also based on the Water hammer equation:

,

and since

,

where is diameter; then:

,

or using the incremental hoop strain,

PWV can be expressed  in terms of and 

,

therefore plotting against gives a 'lnDU-loop', and the linear portion during early systole, when reflected waves are assumed to be minimal, can be used to calculate PWV.

Clinical measurement

Clinical methods 
Clinically, PWV can be measured in several ways and in different locations. The 'gold standard' for arterial stiffness assessment in clinical practice is cfPWV, and validation guidelines have been proposed. Other measures such as brachial-ankle PWV and cardio-ankle vascular index (CAVI) are also popular. For cfPWV, it is recommended that the arrival time of the pulse wave measured simultaneously at both locations, and the distance travelled by the pulse wave calculated as 80% of the direct distance between the common carotid artery in the neck and the femoral artery in the groin.  Numerous devices exist to measure cfPWV; some techniques include:
 use of a transducer to record the time of arrival of the pulse wave at the carotid and femoral arteries.
 use of cuffs placed around the limbs and neck to record the time of arrival of the pulse wave oscillometrically.
 use of Doppler ultrasound or magnetic resonance imaging to record the time of arrival of the pulse wave based on the flow velocity waveform.

Newer devices that employ an arm cuff, fingertip sensors or special weighing scales have been described, but their clinical utility remains to be fully established.

Interpretation 
Current guidelines by the European Society of Hypertension state that a measured PWV larger than 10 m/s can be considered an independent marker of end-organ damage. However, the use of a fixed PWV threshold value is debated, as PWV is dependent on blood pressure. A high pulse wave velocity (PWV) has also been associated with poor lung function.

See also 
 Arterial stiffness
 Blood pressure
 Compliance (physiology)

References 

Hypertension